The American Society of Equity or Farmers Equity was an American agricultural cooperative and political organization, founded in 1902, which aimed to organize farmers as a "Third Power" in the United States, able to compete with capital and organized labor on equal terms. Equity inspired the creation of many farmers' cooperatives still in existence. Equity forces became involved in the politics of Wisconsin, Minnesota, and North Dakota, leading in the latter state to the eventual rise of the Nonpartisan League. Leaders of Equity (such as U.S. Senator Magnus Johnson and Wisconsin State Senator Henry Kleist) were elected to numerous local political offices.

In 1934, it merged into the Farmers' Union.

References 

1902 establishments in the United States
1934 disestablishments in the United States
Agricultural organizations based in the United States
Collective farming
Political history of North Dakota
Nonpartisan League
American Society of Equity